Sonoda is a genus of marine hatchetfishes found in the Atlantic Ocean.

Species
There are currently two recognized species in this genus:
 Sonoda megalophthalma Grey, 1959
 Sonoda paucilampa Grey, 1960

References

Sternoptychidae
Marine fish genera
Ray-finned fish genera